Mylothris talboti is a butterfly in the family Pieridae. It is found in eastern Tanzania. The habitat consists of lowland to submontane forests.

The larvae feed on Santalales species.

References

Butterflies described in 1980
Pierini
Endemic fauna of Tanzania
Butterflies of Africa